Acroceuthes is a genus of moths belonging to the subfamily Tortricinae of the family Tortricidae.

Species
Acroceuthes leucozancla (Turner, 1945)
Acroceuthes metaxanthana (Walker, 1863)

See also
List of Tortricidae genera

References

External links
tortricidae.com

Archipini
Tortricidae genera
Taxa named by Edward Meyrick